Galgotias University (GU) is a private university and the second regional campus of Galgotias Educational Institutions located near  Dankaur village in southern fringes of Greater Noida in Gautam Buddha Nagar district of Uttar Pradesh, India. 

It is recognized by the University Grants Commission (UGC) and was established in 2011. Galgotias University has received NAAC A+ accreditation in 2022. It scored 3.37 out of 4 NAAC score in the first cycle. Under section 12(B) of the UGC Act, it has been declared fit to receive central assistance.

Rankings 

The National Institutional Ranking Framework (NIRF) ranked it 76–100 among pharmacy colleges in 2020 and 151–200 among all universities.

References

Private universities in Uttar Pradesh
Universities and colleges in Noida
Educational institutions established in 2011
2011 establishments in Uttar Pradesh